Ana Cabrera (born May 13, 1982) is an American television journalist. From 2013 to 2022, she worked as a reporter and anchor for CNN.

Biography
Cabrera was raised in a Mexican-American family in Denver and then graduated from Washington State University. After school, she worked for NBC affiliate KHQ-TV in Spokane, Washington. 

She returned to her hometown to work as the morning news anchor at KMGH-TV Channel 7 News in Denver where she earned an Emmy Award for in-the-field reporting as part of a news team covering the High Park fire in 2012. The morning team was also awarded the Associated Press TV and Radio Association's Annual Mark Twain Award for Best Morning Show Broadcast in 2013.

In 2013, Cabrera joined CNN as a correspondent in Denver. She served on the CNN Investigative team. In March 2017, she was named anchor of CNN's weekend edition of CNN Newsroom, succeeding Poppy Harlow. She covered stories including the unrest in Ferguson, Missouri in the aftermath of the shooting death of Michael Brown, the Unite the Right rally of white supremacists in Charlottesville, immigration, marijuana legalization, and the 2017 London Bridge attack. In May 2021, she began anchoring a one-hour weekday afternoon slot of CNN Newsroom.

On December 1, 2022, it was reported that Cabrera was expected to leave the network and join NBC News. Two weeks later, Cabrera confirmed the report stating, "My heart is full of gratitude for the incredible opportunities I've had at CNN to serve our viewers and to work alongside extraordinary journalists ... But after nearly a decade at CNN, I'm making the personal decision to explore a new professional chapter. Time to embrace new challenges and opportunities." Her last broadcast on CNN aired on December 22.

Personal life
Cabrera is married to Benjamin Nielsen; they have two children.

Cabrera is a member of the National Association of Hispanic Journalists and serves on the board of directors of Mi Casa Resource Center. She has also served on the board of the American Cancer Society.

References

1982 births
20th-century American women
21st-century American women
21st-century American journalists
American television news anchors
American people of Mexican descent
American women television journalists
CNN people
Hispanic and Latino American women journalists
Living people
People from Denver
Washington State University alumni